Jason Rawls (born February 27, 1974), better known by his stage name J. Rawls, is an American hip hop musician, producer, disc jockey (DJ), educator, and speaker  born in Columbus, Ohio. He is best known for his work with Masta Ace, Mos Def and Talib Kweli. Because of his work with Black Star, a hip hop group composed of Mos Def and Talib Kweli, and their sole debut studio album, Mos Def & Talib Kweli Are Black Star, Dr. Rawls was soon placed on the map among independent hip-hop producers and became an independent hip-hop main-stay. The album became a huge success and was part of a major force in the late 1990s underground hip-hop explosion. Dr. Rawls has also worked with artists such as Dose One, Domo Genesis, Capital Steez, Beastie Boys, Slum Village, Diamond D, John Robinson, El Da Sensei, Sadat X, Count Bass D, Grand Agent, 9th Wonder, J-Live, Us3 and Moka Only.

Dr. Rawls has released three solo albums, and contributed to the Neo soul movement producing the likes of Aloe Blacc, Eric Roberson, Dudley Perkins, and many others.
Fusing jazz and hip-hop, then coining the term "Jazz-Hop", his 2006 work with "The Liquid Crystal Project" led to national acclaim for his collaboration with B-Jazz, Rob Riley, Eddie Bayard and Charles Cooper and their tribute to producer J. Dilla. His Columbus-based production company and record label continues to make an impact in the national hip hop scene, and he is in high demand as a DJ for top clubs and private functions around the country.

Dr. Rawls was also a featured presenter for the Places of Invention, Bronx, New York, exhibit that opened in July 2015 at the Smithsonian National Museum of American History in Washington, D.C. In this exhibit, a virtual J Rawls walks visitors through the nuances of how to scratch and mix on a replica turntable.
 
Rawls holds a bachelor's degree in business from the University of Cincinnati, a master's degree in education from Ashland University and an Educational Doctorate degree in Educational Administration from Ohio University. In 2018 an adjunct instructor at Tiffin University in Tiffin, Ohio, and has presented workshops on the music industry, Hip-Hop Education and beatmaking at several major universities around the country. He also has more than 15 years of K-12 teaching experience which has landed him an opportunity at Ohio University's Patton College of Education. Patton College is implementing the first ever hip hop-based education program which Dr. Rawls will be teaching.

Career
J. Rawls' first solo album came in 2001, with The Essence of J. Rawls, which featured "Great Live Caper", "Check the Clock" and "They Can't See Me".

J. Rawls is also one half of the duo 3582 alongside Fat Jon of Five Deez. 3582 released two albums, The Living Soul and Situational Ethics.

He released another solo album, The Hip-Hop Affect, in 2011.

Respect Game or Expect Flames, his collaborative album with Casual of Hieroglyphics, was released on Nature Sounds in 2012. It was described by Okayplayer as "one of the most consistently dope and balanced albums in 2012".

In 2014, J. Rawls released an album, entitled The Legacy.

In 2019, J. Rawls and John Robinson released an album, entitled Youth Culture Power (YCP) Itsjayare. For listeners, Youth Culture Power (YCP) by Jay ARE consists of J Rawls produced, jazz-infused hip-hop tracks over which the emcees rhyme poetic on the state of educating inner city youth today. Rawls and Robinson list the many challenges; like culturally-biased standardized tests, the whitewashing of history in  textbooks and the cutting of resources, but counter with a wealth of solutions; like relating to students, implementing new techniques in the classroom and simply being attentive to the happenings of their lives. Rawls also co-authored the book, "Youth Culture Power: A #HipHopEd Guide to Teacher-Student Relationships and Student Engagement" with John Robinson through Peter Lang Publishers. It is about educators and hip-hop artists with experience in the classrooms of urban schools, focus their efforts through Hip-Hop Based Education  (HHBE).  They argue that Hip-Hop culture could be useful in building relationships and building student engagement. The purpose of this book is to present a  fresh take on why educators should not discount the culture of youth  within the classroom.

In 2021, Ohio University's Patton College of Education is implementing the first ever hip-hop based education program that will help prepare pre-service teachers to incorporate culturally relevant pedagogy into their own teaching styles. The innovative and progressive program known as Hip-Hop OHIO Patton Education (HOPE) is led by program coordinator and longtime hip-hop producer Dr. Jason Rawls. Hip Hop Based Education (HHBE) teaches the value of  incorporating hip-hop-based education, culturally relevant pedagogy,  and relational pedagogy into the classroom to build healthy and affirming relationships while bettering engagement with students. Although this type of programming has been taught before, according to  Rawls, this is the first time it will be incorporated into a College of Education's Teacher Education program Itsjayare. For more information visit HOPE Program.

Discography

Studio albums
 The Essence of J. Rawls (2001)
 The Living Soul (2001) 
 Situational Ethics (2003) 
 Histories Greatest Battles, Campaigns & Topics (2003)
 The Essence of Soul (2005)
 The Liquid Crystal Project (2006)
 It's the Dank & Jammy Show (2007) 
 True Ohio Playas (2007) 
 J. Rawls Presents Holmskillit (2007) 
 The Liquid Crystal Project 2 (2008)
 Rawls & Middle (2008) 
 The 1960s Jazz Revolution Again (2009) 
 The Hip-Hop Affect (2011)
 The Liquid Crystal Project 3 (2012)
 Respect Game or Expect Flames (2012) 
 The Legacy (2014)

Compilation albums
 Hotel Beats Vol. 1 (2009)
 Hotel Beats Vol. 2 (2014)
 Bringing it Home Vol. 1 (2001)
 Bringing it Home Vol. 2 (2006)

EPs
 Rawlzey (2015) 
 The Profit (2019) 
 Valor (2020)

Singles
 "Check the Clock" (2000)
 "Great Live Caper" (2001)
 "They Can't See Me" (2001)
 "Soul" / "Bailar" (2005)
 "Pleasure Before Pain" / "Miss You (Bring It Back)" (2005)
 "A Tribute to Dilla" / "Too Personal" (2006)
 "A Tribute to Troy" / "So Fly" (2006)
 "Til the Sun Comes" (2008) 
 "Music Over Madness" (2008) 
 "A Tribute to Da Beatminerz" / "A Tribute to The Beatnuts" (2008)
 "Another Tribute to Dilla" / "Digital Funky" (2008)
 "A Tribute to Souls" / "Capricorn's Reprise" (2008)
 "A Tribute to De La" / "Stakes Still High" (2011)

Productions
 Mos Def & Talib Kweli - "Brown Skin Lady" and "Yo Yeah" from Mos Def & Talib Kweli Are Black Star (1998)
 Doseone - "Spitfire", "Self Explanitory", "That Ol' Pagan Shit", and "Genres" from Hemispheres (1998)
 Themselves - "Directions to My Special Place" from Them (2000)
 Rasco - "Living Voices" from Hostile Environment (2001)
 El Da Sensei - "Lights, Camera, Action!" from The Unusual (2006)
 Capital Steez - "Infinity and Beyond" from AmeriKKKan Korruption (2012)
 MHz Legacy - "Columbus Diss Patch" from MHz Legacy (2012)
 Cas Metah & Wonder Brown - "Drowning Man" from The Darke Bros (2012)

References

External links
 
 

Living people
Rappers from Columbus, Ohio
American hip hop DJs
American hip hop record producers
Alternative hip hop musicians
Five percenters
21st-century American rappers
1974 births
21st-century African-American musicians